Corm is a surname. People with the surname include:

 Charles Corm (1894—1963), Lebanese writer
 Daoud Corm (1852–1930), Lebanese painter
 Georges Corm (born 1940), Lebanese economist

See also
 Corm (disambiguation)

Surnames of Lebanese origin